Muhammad Khalid (born 1973) is a Pakistani field hockey player. He won a bronze medal at the 1992 Summer Olympics in Barcelona.

References

External links
 

1973 births
Living people
Pakistani male field hockey players
Olympic field hockey players of Pakistan
Field hockey players at the 1992 Summer Olympics
Field hockey players at the 1996 Summer Olympics
Olympic bronze medalists for Pakistan
Olympic medalists in field hockey
Medalists at the 1992 Summer Olympics
Commonwealth Games medallists in field hockey
Commonwealth Games bronze medallists for Pakistan
Field hockey players at the 2002 Commonwealth Games
Medallists at the 2002 Commonwealth Games